Ghabbatiyya was a Palestinian Arab hamlet in the Safad Subdistrict. It was depopulated during the 1948 Arab-Israeli War on October 30, 1948, under Operation Hiram. It was located 12 km northwest of Safad. 

In 1945 it had a population of 60 Muslims.

History
In 1881  the PEF's Survey of Western Palestine found at  Kh. Ghabbâti "foundations of walls and one olive press".

British mandate era
In the 1922 census of Palestine conducted by the British Mandate authorities, ‘’Ghabbatia’’  had a population of 9 Muslims.

In the   1945 statistics the population was  60 Muslims, with a total of 3,453 dunams of land, according to an official land and population survey.  Of this,  15  dunams were  plantations and irrigable land,  412 for  cereals; while a total of 2,509 dunams was non-cultivable area.

1948, aftermath
Israeli forces occupied Ghabbatiyya on 30 October 1948. In 1992 the village site was described: "The site is deserted and covered with grass, a few fig trees, stones, and the ruins of stone houses. The walls of one destroyed house still stand. The surrounding land is used by Israelis for grazing and forestry, and woods cover nearby Mount ‘Adathir."

References

Bibliography

External links
   Welcome To Ghabbatiyya,
Ghabbatiyya, Zochrot
Ghabbattiyya,  Villages of Palestine
Survey of Western Palestine, Map 4: IAA, Wikimedia commons

Arab villages depopulated during the 1948 Arab–Israeli War
District of Safad